Patrick Pohl (born January 8, 1990)  is a German professional ice hockey forward who currently plays for Eispiraten Crimmitschau of the DEL2. He has previously played with Eisbären Berlin, Grizzly Adams Wolfsburg and Hamburg Freezers. On June 2, 2015, Pohl left the Freezers and signed a one-year contract with Schwenninger Wild Wings.

References

External links

1990 births
Living people
Dresdner Eislöwen players
Eisbären Berlin players
ETC Crimmitschau players
German ice hockey centres
Hamburg Freezers players
Schwenninger Wild Wings players
Grizzlys Wolfsburg players